Pagodula mucrone is a species of sea snail, a marine gastropod mollusk in the family Muricidae, the murex snails or rock snails.

Description
The length of the shell attains 26.5 mm.

Distribution
This species occurs in the Atlantic Ocean off Southeast Brazil

References

 Marshall B.A. & Houart R. (2011) The genus Pagodula (Mollusca: Gastropoda: Muricidae) in Australia, the New Zealand region and the Tasman Sea. New Zealand Journal of Geology and Geophysics 54(1): 89–114.

External links
 Houart, R. (1991). The southeastern Brazilian Muricidae collected by RV Marion-Dufresne in 1987, with the description of three new species. The Nautilus. 105 (1): 26-37.

Gastropods described in 1991
Pagodula